Cohee and Tuckahoe were terms applied to people of Colonial Virginia to differentiate original English settlers in eastern Virginia (Tuckahoes) from German, Irish, and Scotch-Irish in the Shenandoah Valley (Cohees).

References

History of Virginia